Jaltomata aspera is a plant species native to Peru. It grows on rocky hillsides at elevations less than 1800 m.

Jaltomata aspera is a shrub up to 2 m tall. It has solitary, hanging flowers, greenish-yellow in color with blood-red nectar. Fruits are orange to white.

References

aspera
Flora of Peru